Siversky  (also Ziverskaya) is an air base in Leningrad Oblast, Russia, 2 km northwest of Siversky. It is a small airfield 65 km south of Saint Petersburg (Leningrad) and is home to the 67th Bomber Aviation Regiment, flying Sukhoi Su-24 aircraft. According to Natural Resources Defense Council it has served as a nuclear bomber base. A United States joint military inspection was conducted at the base on February 11, 1992, which confirmed a Su-24 presence.

Jet fighter aircraft were reported at Siversky as early as 1955. During the 1960s Siversky had as many as 77 fighter jets based at the airfield while a 1967 reconnaissance mission only revealed three aircraft.  By 1980 Siversky was home to a Mikoyan MiG-27M regiment.

References

External links
Michael Holm, 67th Bomber Aviation Regiment, accessed August 2011

Soviet Air Force bases
Russian Air Force bases